is a passenger railway station located in the city of Toyooka, Hyōgo Prefecture, Japan, operated by West Japan Railway Company (JR West).

Lines

Station layout
The station consists of one ground-level side platform and one ground-level island platform connected by a footbridge. The station is staffed. Although the rails remain in place, one side of the island platform is not in use, and is fenced off.

Platforms

Adjacent stations

History
Takeno Station opened on October 25, 1911. With the privatization of the Japan National Railways (JNR) on April 1, 1987, the station came under the aegis of the West Japan Railway Company.

Passenger statistics
In fiscal 2017, the station was used by an average of 226 passengers daily

Surrounding area
 Takenohama
Cape Nekozaki
Toyooka City Takeno Elementary School / Junior High School

See also
List of railway stations in Japan

References

External links

 Station Official Site

Railway stations in Hyōgo Prefecture
Sanin Main Line
Railway stations in Japan opened in 1911
Toyooka, Hyōgo